Tatabánya KC is a Hungarian handball club, based in Tatabánya, Hungary.

European record
As of 15 October 2019:

EHF-organised seasonal competitions
Tatabánya score listed first. As of 15 October 2019.''

European Cup

EHF Cup

Cup Winners' Cup
From the 2012–13 season, the men's competition was merged with the EHF Cup.

References

External links
 Official website
 Grundfos Tatabánya KC at eurohandball.com

Hungarian handball clubs in European handball